John Teixeira da Conceição (born November 18, 1986), commonly known as John Macapá, is a Brazilian mixed martial artist currently competing in the featherweight division. A professional competitor since 2007, Teixeira has formerly competed for the Ultimate Fighting Championship, Bellator MMA, and was a contestant on The Ultimate Fighter: Brazil.

Mixed martial arts career

Early career
From September 2007 to December 2011, Macapá amassed an undefeated record of 12–0–1, fighting exclusively in his native Brazil.

Macapá was ranked as the eighth best featherweight prospect in BloodyElbow.com's 2012 scouting report.

The Ultimate Fighter
In March 2012, it was revealed that Macapá would be a participant on The Ultimate Fighter: Brazil. In the entry round, Macapá defeated Giovanni da Silva Santos, Jr. via submission in the first round to move into the house.

Macapá was picked third (fifth overall) by Wanderlei Silva to be on Team Wanderlei. He was then selected to face Rodrigo Damm in the quarterfinals of the tournament. He lost via split decision after three rounds.

Ultimate Fighting Championship
Macapá made his UFC debut at UFC 147 on June 23, 2012 against Hugo Viana at a catchweight of 150 lbs, after Macapá missed weight. He lost via split decision. Macapá was released from the promotion after his loss to Viana.

Bellator MMA
Macapá made his Bellator and United States debut at Bellator 128 on October 10, 2014 against Scott Cleve. He won the fight via split decision.

Macapá faced Fabrício Guerreiro at Bellator 136 on April 10, 2015. He won the fight by split decision.

Macapá next faced Gleristone Santos at Bellator 143 on September 25, 2015.  He won the fight via split decision.

With three straight victories in Bellator, Macapá was set to face former Bellator Featherweight Champion, Patrício Freire, at Bellator 153 on April 22, 2016. A rib injury, however, forced Macapá out of the bout.

Macapá was again scheduled to face another former Bellator Featherweight Champion in Pat Curran, at Bellator 167 on December 3, 2016. However, an injury to Curran forced him out of the bout and, as a result, Macapá faced off against former UFC competitor Justin Lawrence. Throughout the fight, Macapá utilized leg kicks to nullify the movement of Lawrence, while continuously moving forward with power punches. After three rounds, Macapá was awarded a victory via unanimous decision.

Macapá faced Daniel Weichel at Bellator 177 on April 14, 2017. He lost the fight via split decision.

The bout with Curran was rescheduled for Bellator 184 on October 6, 2017. He lost the fight by unanimous decision.

Macapá faced A. J. McKee on September 21, 2018 at Bellator 205, replacing Pat Curran. He lost the fight via knockout in round one.

Macapá next faced Kevin Croom at Bellator 218 on March 22, 2019. He won the fight via unanimous decision.

Macapá then faced Ashleigh Grimshaw at Bellator 226 on September 7, 2019. He won the fight via technical knockout after the doctor stopped the fight before round three. Subsequently, he signed a new exclusive, multi-fight contract with Bellator.

As the first fight of his new contract, Macapá faced Mikuru Asakura at Rizin 20 on December 31, 2019. He lost the back-and-forth fight via unanimous decision.

Macapá faced John de Jesus at Bellator 261 on June 25, 2021. He lost the close bout via split decision.

On July 10, 2021, it was announced that he was no longer under contract with Bellator.

Post Bellator 
Macapá faced Jaciel Lima on December 18, 2021 at Shooto Brasil 110. He won the bout via TKO in the first round.

Macapá faced Timur Nagibin on May 6, 2022 at RCC 11. He lost the bout via unanimous decision.

Macapá faced Abdul-Rakhman Dudaev on July 22, 2022 at ACA 141. He lost the bout after getting knocked out by a spinning backfist 44 seconds into the bout.

Macapá faced Mauricio Machado on October 28, 2022 at Shooto Brasil 111. He won the bout via TKO in the first round.

Macapá faced Akhmadkhan Bokov on March 9, 2023 at ACA 153: Dzhanaev vs. Pessoa, winning the bout via unanimous decision.

Personal life
Prior to becoming a fighter, Teixeira worked as a shop assistant and motorcycle courier.

In October 2013, Teixeira's home was among hundreds destroyed in a fire tragedy in Macapá, Brazil.

Mixed martial arts record

|-
|Win
|align=center|26–8–2
|Akhmadkhan Bokov
|Decision (unanimous)
|ACA 153: Dzhanaev vs. Pessoa
|
|align=center|3
|align=center|5:00
|Moscow, Russia
|
|-
|Win
|align=center|25–8–2
|Mauricio Machado
|TKO (punches)
|Shooto Brasil 111
|
|align=center|1
|align=center|0:36
|Rio de Janeiro, Brazil
|
|-
|Loss
|align=center|24–8–2
|Abdul-Rakhman Dudaev
|KO (spinning backfist)
|ACA 141: Froes vs. Suleymanov
|
|align=center|1
|align=center|0:44
|Sochi, Russia
|
|-
|Loss
|align=center|24–7–2
|Timur Nagibin
|Decision (unanimous)
|RCC 11
|
|align=center|3
|align=center|5:00
|Yekaterinburg, Russia
|
|-
|Win
|align=center|24–6–2
|Jaciel Lima
|TKO (punches)
|Shooto Brasil 110
|
|align=center|1
|align=center|1:38
|Rio de Janeiro, Brazil
|
|-
|Loss
|align=center|23–6–2
|John de Jesus
|Decision (split)
|Bellator 261 
|
|align=center|3
|align=center|5:00
|Uncasville, Connecticut, United States 
|
|-
|Loss
|align=center|23–5–2
|Mikuru Asakura
|Decision (unanimous)
|Rizin 20
|
|align=center|3
|align=center|5:00
|Saitama, Japan
|
|-
|Win
|align=center|23–4–2
|Ashleigh Grimshaw
|TKO (doctor stoppage)
|Bellator 226
|
|align=center| 2
|align=center| 5:00
|San Jose, California, United States
| 
|-
| Win
| align=center|22–4–2
| Kevin Croom
| Decision (unanimous)
| Bellator 218
| 
| align=center| 3
| align=center| 5:00
| Thackerville, Oklahoma, United States
| 
|-
| Loss
| align=center|21–4–2
| A.J. McKee
| KO (punch)
| Bellator 205
| 
| align=center| 1
| align=center| 1:09
| Boise, Idaho, United States
| 
|-
| Loss
| align=center|21–3–2
| Pat Curran
| Decision (unanimous)
| Bellator 184
| 
| align=center| 3
| align=center| 5:00
| Thackerville, Oklahoma, United States
| 
|-
| Loss
| align=center|21–2–2
| Daniel Weichel
| Decision (split)
| Bellator 177
| 
| align=center|3
| align=center|5:00
| Budapest, Hungary
|
|-
| Win
| align=center|21–1–2
| Justin Lawrence
| Decision (unanimous)
| Bellator 167
| 
| align=center|3
| align=center|5:00
| Thackerville, Oklahoma, United States
|
|-
| Win
| align=center|20–1–2
| Milson Araujo
| Decision (unanimous)
| Eco Fight Championship
| 
| align=center|3
| align=center|5:00
| Macapá, Amapá, Brazil
|
|-
| Win
| align=center|19–1–2
| Gleristone Santos
| Decision (split)
| Bellator 143
| 
| align=center|3
| align=center|5:00
| Hidalgo, Texas, United States
|
|-
|Win
|align=center|18–1–2
|Fabrício Guerreiro
|Decision (split)
|Bellator 136
|
|align=center|3
|align=center|5:00
|Irvine, California, United States
|
|-
|Win
|align=center|17–1–2
|Scott Cleve
|Decision (split)
|Bellator 128
|
|align=center|3
|align=center|5:00
|Thackerville, Oklahoma, United States
|
|-
|Win
|align=center|16–1–2
|Oberdan Vieira Tenorio
|Submission (rear-naked choke)
|Iron Man Vale Tudo 27
|
|align=center|3
|align=center|3:20
|Macapá, Amapá, Brazil
|
|-
|Draw
|align=center|15–1–2
|Rivaldo Junior
|Draw (split)
|Shooto: Brazil 40
|
|align=center|3
|align=center|5:00
|Manaus, Amazonas, Brazil
|
|-
|Win
|align=center|15–1–1
|Lucas Caio
|TKO (doctor stoppage)
|Shooto: Brazil 38
|
|align=center|1
|align=center|2:58
|São Paulo, Brazil
|
|-
|Win
|align=center|14–1–1
|Francisco Cylderlan Lima da Silva
|KO (punch)
|MMA Rocks
|
|align=center|1
|align=center|0:32
|São Paulo, Brazil
|
|-
|Win
|align=center|13–1–1
|Rafael Macedo 
|TKO (doctor stoppage)
|Shooto: Brazil 35
|
|align=center|1
|align=center|5:00
|Rio de Janeiro, Brazil
|
|-
|Loss
|align=center|12–1–1
|Hugo Viana
|Decision (split)
|UFC 147
|
|align=center|3
|align=center|5:00
|Belo Horizonte, Minas Gerais, Brazil
|
|-
|Win
|align=center|12–0–1
|Paulo Dinis
|Technical Submission (arm-triangle choke)
|Amazon Fight 10
|
|align=center|2
|align=center|2:10
|Belém, Pará, Brazil
|
|-
|Win
|align=center|11–0–1
|Jamil Silveira da Conceicao
|Submission (guillotine choke)
|Golden Fight 2
|
|align=center|1
|align=center|N/A
|Macapá, Amapá, Brazil
|
|-
|Win
|align=center|10–0–1
|Guilherme Matos Rodrigues
|KO (punch)
|Amazon Fight 9
|
|align=center|3
|align=center|4:01
|Belém, Pará, Brazil
|
|-
|Win
|align=center|9–0–1
|Rafael Carvalho
|Submission (rear-naked choke)
|Iron Man Vale Tudo 20
|
|align=center|3
|align=center|3:47
|Macapá, Amapá, Brazil
|
|-
|Win
|align=center|8–0–1
|Michel Addario Bastos
|Decision (unanimous)
|Iron Man Championship: Champions
|
|align=center|3
|align=center|5:00
|Belém, Pará, Brazil
|
|-
|Win
|align=center|7–0–1
|Francisco Carvalho Jr.
|Submission (kimura)
|Hiro Super Fight 13
|
|align=center|1
|align=center|2:10
|Belém, Pará, Brazil
|
|-
|Win
|align=center|6–0–1
|Jimmy Lira Nascimento
|Submission (kimura)
|Gladiador Fight
|
|align=center|1
|align=center|2:07
|Macapá, Amapá, Brazil
|
|-
|Win
|align=center|5–0–1
|Willian Cabocao
|Decision (unanimous)
|Super Pitbull Fight
|
|align=center|3
|align=center|5:00
|Castanhal, Pará, Brazil
|
|-
|Draw
|align=center|4–0–1
|Rodrigo de Lima
|Draw
|Arena Fighting Championship
|
|align=center|3
|align=center|5:00
|Macapá, Amapá, Brazil
|
|-
|Win
|align=center|4–0
|Alisson Deivid Rodrigues
|Submission (armbar)
|MMA: Evolution 1
|
|align=center|3
|align=center|3:27
|Macapá, Amapá, Brazil
|
|-
|Win
|align=center|3–0
|Marcio Alex dos Santos Vales
|Submission (armbar)
|WCC: W-Combat 2
|
|align=center|1
|align=center|2:03
|Macapá, Amapá, Brazil
|
|-
|Win
|align=center|2–0
|Alex Pantoja dos Santos
|Submission (armbar)
|WCC: W-Combat 2
|
|align=center|1
|align=center|1:59
|Macapá, Amapá, Brazil
|
|-
|Win
|align=center|1–0
|Marcio Alex dos Santos Vales
|Submission (armbar)
|Dragon Fight Championship
|
|align=center|3
|align=center|1:24
|Macapá, Amapá, Brazil
|
|-
|}

Mixed martial arts exhibition record

|-
| Loss
| align=center| 1–1
| Rodrigo Damm
| Decision (split)
| The Ultimate Fighter: Brazil
|  (airdate)
| align=center| 3
| align=center| 5:00
| São Paulo, Brazil
| 
|-
| Win
| align=center| 1–0
| Giovanni Santos
| Submission (armbar)
| The Ultimate Fighter: Brazil
|  (airdate)
| align=center| 1
| align=center| 0:00
| São Paulo, Brazil
|

References

External links
 
 
 John Macapá from UFC Fans

Living people
1986 births
Brazilian male mixed martial artists
Featherweight mixed martial artists
Mixed martial artists utilizing Brazilian jiu-jitsu
People from Macapá
Ultimate Fighting Championship male fighters
Brazilian practitioners of Brazilian jiu-jitsu
People awarded a black belt in Brazilian jiu-jitsu
Sportspeople from Amapá